"Finger Poppin' Time" is a song written by Hank Ballard and performed by Hank Ballard & The Midnighters.  It reached #2 on the U.S. R&B chart and #7 on the U.S. pop chart in 1960.  It was featured on their 1960 album Mr. Rhythm and Blues.  Ballard re-released a version of the song in 1972 as a single, but it did not chart.

The song was nominated for the Grammy Award for Best R&B Performance in 1961, losing to "Let the Good Times Roll" by Ray Charles.

The song ranked #49 on Billboard magazine's Top 100 singles of 1960.

Other versions
The Stanley Brothers released a version of the song as a single in 1960, but it did not chart.
Hello People featuring Utopia released a version of the song on their 1974 album The Handsome Devils.
Lou Ann Barton featuring The Flemtones released a version of the song on her 1982 album Old Enough.

In popular culture
The song was mentioned in the 1974 song "Life Is a Rock (But the Radio Rolled Me)" by Reunion.
Ballard's version was featured in the 1984 film The Flamingo Kid.
The song was also heard in the 1993 film ''The Sandlot.

References

1960 songs
1960 singles
1972 singles
Songs written by Hank Ballard
Hank Ballard songs
Hank Ballard & the Midnighters songs
The Stanley Brothers songs
Song recordings produced by Todd Rundgren
Song recordings produced by Jerry Wexler
King Records (United States) singles